Fargo National Cemetery is a 4.8 acre United States Department of Veterans Affairs (VA) national cemetery located in Raymond Township, Cass County, North Dakota (the street address is Harwood, North Dakota). The cemetery will serve the burial needs of more than 30,000 Veterans, their spouses and eligible family members.

History and location
In June 2016, the VA purchased the property at 8709 40th Avenue N, County Road 20, Harwood, North Dakota for $93,445 A contract to build the cemetery was awarded in July 2017.

This is the first national cemetery built in North Dakota and is part of the VA National Cemetery Administration Rural Initiative to provide access to VA burial benefits for Veterans who reside in rural areas and who have not previously had reasonable access to a national or state Veterans cemetery.

The cemetery was dedicated on September 7, 2019 and the first interment took place on October 15, 2019. The first phase of cemetery development offers more than 3,000 casket and cremation spaces to accommodate burials for the next 10 years. The cemetery will provide burials for caskets, in-ground and columbarium burials for cremations, as well as a memorial wall for remains that are unrecoverable or identified, were buried at sea, donated to science or cremated and remains scattered.

Fargo National Cemetery is the second Rural Initiative cemetery in the nation, and the first to be built by the VA's National Cemetery Administration.

References

External links
 

United States national cemeteries
Cemeteries in North Dakota
Protected areas of Cass County, North Dakota